Frevert is a surname. Notable people with the surname include:

Louise Frevert (born 1953), Danish politician
Marcella Frevert (born 1937), American
Tommy Frevert (born 1986), American football player
Ute Frevert (born 1954), German Historian

See also
5137 Frevert, main-belt asteroid